Ceriagrion whellani is a species of damselfly in the family Coenagrionidae. It is found in Botswana, Central African Republic, the Republic of the Congo, Ivory Coast, Equatorial Guinea, Gabon, Ghana, Guinea, Kenya, Liberia, Sierra Leone, Tanzania, Uganda, Zambia, Zimbabwe, possibly Burundi, and possibly Malawi. Its natural habitats are subtropical or tropical moist lowland forests, moist savanna, subtropical or tropical moist shrubland, shrub-dominated wetlands, swamps, freshwater marshes, and intermittent freshwater marshes.

References

Coenagrionidae
Insects described in 1952
Taxonomy articles created by Polbot